Stevie, ST Editor for VI Enthusiasts, 
is a discontinued clone of Bill Joy's vi text editor. Stevie was written by Tim Thompson for the Atari ST in 1987.  It later became the basis for Vim, which was released in 1991.

Thompson posted his original C source code as free software to the comp.sys.atari.st newsgroup on 28 June 1987.  Tony Andrews added features and ported it to Unix, OS/2 and Amiga, posting his version to the comp.sources.unix newsgroup as free software on 6 June 1988.  In 1991, Bram Moolenaar released Vim, which he based on the source code of the Amiga port of Stevie.

References 

Vi
Free text editors
Atari ST software
Amiga software
Unix text editors
OS/2 text editors
Free software programmed in C
Cross-platform free software